Robert Livingston Gerry is the name of:

 Robert Livingston Gerry Sr. (1877–1957), American businessman and owner of thoroughbred racehorses
 Robert L. Gerry Jr (1911–1979), American polo player
 Robert L. Gerry III (b. 1937), American businessman and petroleum industry executive

See also
 Robert Livingston (disambiguation)